The Works may refer to:

Music
 The Works (Queen album), 1984 album by the British rock band Queen
 The Works (Nik Kershaw album), 1989 album by singer-songwriter Nik Kershaw
 The Works (Saga album), 1991 greatest hit compilation
 The Works (Phil Beer album), 1998 folk music album
 The Works (Jon Stevens album), a 2005 acoustic album
 The Works (The Corrs album), 2007 compilation album
 The Works (Bananarama album), 2007 retrospective of Bananarama's music
 The Works (Faith No More album), 2008 compilation of Faith No More songs
 The Works (The Wildhearts album), 2008 compilation album
 The Works (Echo & the Bunnymen album), 2008 boxed set compilation album
 The Works (Jonatha Brooke album), 2008 folk-rock album
 The Works (Spiers and Boden album), 2011 folk music album
 The Works Recording Studio, a studio near Manchester, UK

Television
 The Works (1990s TV series), RTÉ show presented by Mary Kingston
 The Works (Irish TV programme), an Irish arts television programme presented by John Kelly that has aired on RTÉ since 2011
 The Works (U.S. TV program), a 2008 American television program that aired on History Channel
 The Works (TV network), a movie channel from MGM

Other uses
 The Works (film), an uncompleted computer-animated film
 The Works (mixed-use development), a mixed-use development in Atlanta, Georgia
 The Works (retailer), a UK-based discount book retailer
 The Works (science museum), a science museum in Bloomington, Minnesota
 The Works Art & Design Festival, a festival in Edmonton, Canada
 A fictional location in the Star Wars prequel era
 An alternate name for supreme pizza, which consists of a mix of meat and vegetable toppings.

See also
 Works (disambiguation)
 Work (disambiguation)